Franco Cucinotta (born 22 June 1952) is an Italian former professional footballer who played as a striker. He spent his entire career in the Swiss Super League, and during the 1976–77 season, he was the top scorer in both the Swiss League, and the European Cup with FC Zürich.

Career
Born in Novara di Sicilia, Franco Cucinotta grew up in Montreux, Switzerland, the city to which his family had emigrated for work in 1960. He also later began his professional footballing career in Switzerland, and despite being Italian, is one of the few Italian footballers to have never once played in Italy, spending his entire career in the Swiss League.

While playing for Swiss club FC Zürich (1976–78), Cucinotta was the top scorer of the 1977 European Cup alongside Gerd Müller, scoring a total of five goals in the competition, in which he helped Zürich to reach the semi-finals. He also finished the 1976–77 season as top scorer in the Nationalliga A, with 21 goals, scoring a total of 28 goals in all competitions, which earned him nominations for the Swiss Footballer of the Year and the Swiss Foreign Footballer of the Year Awards.

Cucinotta also played in Switzerland for FC Lausanne-Sport (1970–74), FC Sion (1974–76; 1981–83), winning the Swiss Cup in 1982, FC Chiasso (1978–79), and Servette FC (1979–1981), winning the Swiss League Cup in 1980, and retiring in 1985.

After retirement
After retiring, Cucinotta worked in insurance, and, after his divorce in 1988, also later moved to Africa for work, where he remained until 2007. He later returned to Switzerland, where he pursued a career in finance.

Style of play
Cucinotta was a very fast centre-forward, with a keen eye for goal, who was also capable of playing as a winger. Due to his abilities, he was compared to fellow Sicilian footballer Pietro Anastasi.

Honours

Club
Servette
Swiss League Cup: 1979–80

Sion
Swiss Cup: 1981–82

Individual
Swiss-League Top-scorer: 1976–77 (21 goals)
European Cup top-scorer: 1976–77 (5 goals)

References

1952 births
Living people
People from Novara di Sicilia
Italian footballers
FC Lausanne-Sport players
FC Sion players
FC Zürich players
FC Chiasso players
Servette FC players
Swiss Super League players
UEFA Champions League top scorers
Association football forwards
Italian expatriate footballers
Italian expatriate sportspeople in Switzerland
Expatriate footballers in Switzerland
Sportspeople from the Province of Messina
Footballers from Sicily
People from Montreux
Sportspeople from the canton of Vaud